Besnik is a village in the municipality of Rožaje, Montenegro.

Name
The name of the village comes from the Albanian masculine name Besnik.

Demographics
According to the 2011 census, its population was 349, all but three of them Bosniaks.

References

Populated places in Rožaje Municipality